Ziauddin Pur is a census town in North East district in the Indian state of Delhi.

Demographics
 India census, Ziauddin Pur had a population of 48,028. Males constitute 54% of the population and females 46%. Ziauddin Pur has an average literacy rate of 67%, higher than the national average of 59.5%: male literacy is 73%, and female literacy is 59%. In Ziauddin Pur, 17% of the population is under 6 years of age.

References

Cities and towns in North East Delhi district